Michelle Griglione (born c. 1969) is an American former competitive swimmer who won a silver medal in the 400-meter individual medley event at the 1986 World Aquatics Championships in Madrid, Spain. She barely missed Olympic qualifications in 1984, 1988, 1992, and 1996, finishing in third-fourth places, but she won five medals at the Pan American Games and Pan Pacific championships in 1985, 1987, 1989 and 1995.

Her father, John, was an All-America football player at Iowa State. She studied at T.C. Williams High School and Stanford University, graduating in 1991. She then obtained a degree in chemical engineering at the University of Florida and for five years did computer simulations at Agere Systems. She is married to Robert Baker; they have a daughter, Penelope (born c. 2003), and live in Orlando.

References

1969 births
Living people
American female butterfly swimmers
American female medley swimmers
Stanford Cardinal women's swimmers
Swimmers at the 1987 Pan American Games
Swimmers at the 1995 Pan American Games
University of Florida alumni
World Aquatics Championships medalists in swimming
Pan American Games silver medalists for the United States
Pan American Games medalists in swimming
Medalists at the 1987 Pan American Games
Medalists at the 1995 Pan American Games
20th-century American women